Solomon ben Moses Raphael London (1661–1748) was a Lithuanian author and publisher, who lived in Novogrudok in the first half of the eighteenth century. He was the pupil of Rabbi Samuel Schotten of Frankfurt.

Publications

  On the rites of circumcision.
 
 
  On the Pirkei Avot, containing extracts from Rashi, Maimonides, and the Pirkei Moshe and Lev Avot of Michael Moraftschek.
  The order of Sabbath prayers according to Isaac Luria.
  With a Yiddish translation.
 
  a collection of rites, prayers, and dinim, with a small Hebrew and Yiddish vocabulary under the title Ḥinnukh Katan.
  Moral exhortations of Judah Ḥasid, and the Hadrakah of Johanan Luria.

References
 

1661 births
1748 deaths
18th-century Lithuanian Jews
18th-century Lithuanian writers
Hebrew-language writers
Jewish writers
Lithuanian publishers (people)